Chai Kek is a village in Lam Tsuen, Tai Po District, Hong Kong.

Administration
Chai Kek is a recognized village under the New Territories Small House Policy.

History
At the time of the 1911 census, the population of Tsai Kek was 129. The number of males was 51.

References

External links
 Delineation of area of existing village Chai Kek (Tai Po) for election of resident representative (2019 to 2022)
 Antiquities Advisory Board. Historic Building Appraisal. Chung Ancestral Hall, Chai Kek Pictures

Lam Tsuen

Villages in Tai Po District, Hong Kong